Joseph Malanji (born 28 August 1965) is a Zambian politician and business executive who previously served as a member of the National Assembly for Kwacha constituency. He was Minister of Foreign Affairs between 2018 and 2021.

Career 
Malanji was appointed by President Rupiah Banda to the National Executive Committee for Land and Natural Resources in 2011. Formerly a member of the Movement for Multi-Party Democracy, Malanji joined the Patriotic Front during the presidency of Banda's successor, Michael Sata. In 2013, Malanji was elected head of the African Golf Confederation. During the 2016 Zambian general election, Malanji was elected as a Member of Parliament to the constituency of Kwacha in the Copperbelt Province of Zambia. On 5 January 2018, President Edgar Lungu appointed Malanji as Minister of Foreign Affairs. As head of the SADC Electoral Observation Committee, Malanji was tasked with ensuring a fair and free Congolese general election. In 2017, Malanji served as one of Zambia's representatives to the Fourth Pan-African Parliament.

At the 2021 Zambian general election, Malanji stood again for the Kwacha constituency seat in Kitwe District and retained the seat. However, in August 2022, the Kwacha seat was nullified and Malanji lost his position as a Member of Parliament.

Personal life 
Malanji is married and enjoys golfing.

References

1965 births
Living people
Patriotic Front (Zambia) politicians
Members of the National Assembly of Zambia
Foreign Ministers of Zambia